Ronald Frederick Bryers (14 November 1919 – 20 August 1987) was a New Zealand rugby union player. He was a lock, but in his early career was in the backs and was a loose forward. He played one match for New Zealand, against Australia in the first test in 1949.

Bryers was born in Raetihi and educated at Ohakune District High School. He enlisted in the New Zealand Army in World War II; he was then a teacher living in the Bulls Schoolhouse. He served in the 34th Battalion, and played in service games.

In 1946, he played for the New Zealand Māori against Australia. As a Māori, he could not be selected for the 1949 tour of South Africa so played against Australia instead. He retired as headmaster of Mount Maunganui primary school, and died in Tauranga Hospital.

He captained King Country. He was a selector for the New Zealand Māori from 1957 to 1958 and for Bay of Plenty from 1962 to 1973.

References

Bibliography
 

1919 births
1987 deaths
New Zealand rugby union players
New Zealand international rugby union players
Rugby union locks
People from Raetihi
Māori All Blacks players
Rugby union players from Manawatū-Whanganui